Rezső Seress (Hungarian: Seress Rezső, ; 3 November 1889 – 12 January 1968) was a Hungarian pianist and composer.  Some sources give his birth name as Rudolf ("Rudi") Spitzer.

Biography
Rezső Seress lived most of his life in poverty in Budapest, from where, being Jewish, he was taken to a labor camp by the Nazis during the Second World War. He survived the camp and after employment in the theatre and the circus, where he was a trapeze artist, he concentrated on songwriting and singing after an injury. Seress taught himself to play the piano with only one hand. He composed many songs, including Fizetek főúr (Waiter, bring me the bill), Én úgy szeretek részeg lenni (I love being drunk), and a song for the Hungarian Communist Party to commemorate the chain bridge crossing the river in Budapest, Újra a Lánchídon (Again on the chain bridge).

His most famous composition is Szomorú Vasárnap ("Gloomy Sunday"), written in 1933, which gained infamy as it became associated with a spate of suicides.

Seress felt a strong loyalty to Hungary, and one reason for his poverty while having a world-famous song was that he never wished to go to the USA to collect his royalties, instead staying as pianist at the Kispipa restaurant in his home town. This restaurant had a pipe stove at the centre of its dining room and was remarkably cold for a restaurant. The place was a favourite of prostitutes, musicians, bohemian spirits and the Jewish working class.

As his fame began to wane, along with his loyalty to the communist party, Seress plunged into depression. Though he himself survived the Nazi forced labour in the Ukraine, his mother didn't, which intensified his gloom.

Seress committed suicide in Budapest in January 1968; he survived jumping out of a window, but later in the hospital, he choked himself to death with a wire. His obituary in The New York Times mentions the notorious reputation of "Gloomy Sunday":

References

External links

1889 births
1968 suicides
Hungarian composers
Hungarian male composers
Hungarian Jews
Hungarian pianists
Musicians from Budapest
Suicides by jumping in Hungary
20th-century composers
20th-century pianists
Male pianists
20th-century Hungarian male musicians